The Biathlon World Cup is a top-level biathlon season-long competition series. It has been held since the winter seasons of 1977–78 for men and 1982–83 for women. The women's seasons until 1986–87 season were called the European Cup, although participation was not restricted to Europeans.

Competition and format

The World Cup season lasts from November or December to late March, with meetings in a different venue every week excluding some holidays and a couple of weeks before the season's major championships (World Championships or Winter Olympics). All in all, the season comprises nine to ten meetings, with events taking place from Wednesday–Thursday through Sunday. Relay competitions are held four to six times per season. Also counting as World Cup events are World Championships, and formerly Winter Olympics events (the last Olympics to count towards the World Cup were the 2010 Winter Olympics: from the 2014 Winter Olympics competitors are no longer awarded World Cup points for their Olympic performances).

The athlete with the highest overall total score (i.e. total score for all disciplines) of the World Cup season is awarded the Big Crystal Globe trophy. A Small Crystal Globe trophy is awarded for the first place in the season total for each discipline. Hence, it is possible for an athlete to win both the Big Crystal Globe and Small Crystal Globes for the same World Cup season.

The tables given below provide an overview of the highest-ranking biathletes and nations of each WC season. 
For sprint/individual/pursuit/mass start first place gives 90 points, 2nd place – 75 pts, 3rd place – 60 pts, 4th place – 50 pts, 5th place – 45 pts, 6th place – 40 pts, 7th – 36 pts, 8th – 34 points, 9th – 32 points, 10th – 31 points, then linearly decreasing by one point down to the 40th place. In Equal placings (ties) give an equal number of points. The sum of all WC points of the season, less the points from an IBU-predetermined number of events (e.g. 2), gives the biathlete's total WC score.

From 1985 to 2000, WC points were awarded so that the first four places gave 30, 26, 24, and 22 points, respectively, and then the 5th to 25th place gave 21, 20, ..., down to 1 point. Before this, points were simply awarded linearly from 25 to 1.

Men's results
 Romanization of Cyrillic script-based names follows the IBU's athlete records.
 See the List of IOC country codes for expansions of country abbreviations.

Men's overall

 Statistics by athlete

 Statistics by country

Men's U25

 Statistics by country

Men's relay

 Statistics by country

Women's results
 Romanization of Cyrillic script-based names follows the IBU's athlete records.
 See the List of IOC country codes for expansions of country abbreviations.

Women's overall
The women's World Cup seasons until 1986–87 were actually called the European Cup, although participation was open to biathletes of all nationalities. Until 1987–88, women raced on shorter tracks than they do today. The 1988–89 season was the first in which women raced on tracks of the same length that they do nowadays.

Notes
1 Petra Schaaf married XC skier and later German national XC ski team coach Jochen Behle.
2 Helena Jonsson married fellow biathlete David Ekholm in 2010.
3 Kaisa Mäkäräinen was the winner at the conclusion of the season with Tora Berger 2nd. However, the results of Olga Zaitseva were later annulled due to doping offences. The recalculation would have given overall world cup win to Berger, but the IBU made the decision based on the principle that clean athletes cannot be punished for the doping offenses of others.
4 Gabriela Soukalová took the name Koukalová when she married professional badminton player Petr Koukal in 2016. They divorced in 2020.
 Statistics by athlete

 Statistics by country

Women's U25

 Statistics by country

Women's relay

 Statistics by country

Mixed relay 

 Statistics by country

Individual discipline titles

Men's titles

 Statistics by athlete

 Statistics by country

Women's titles

 Statistics by athlete

 Statistics by country

Nations Cup

Men's Nations Cup

Women's Nations Cup

Race winners 
Below is a list of all male and female biathletes that have won five or more individual World Cup or Olympic races. Biathletes whose names are in bold are still active.
 Updated: 19 March 2023

Race winners by decade

Men

Note:  Frank Luck,   Sergei Tchepikov,  Ole Einar Bjørndalen, and  Arnd Peiffer, are the only biathletes to win World Cup races in three decades.

1950s (2 races)

1960s (10 races)

1970s (32 races)

1980s (120 races, 1 tied result)

1990s (162 races, 1 tied result)

2000s (255 races)

2010s (256 races, 1 tied result)

2020s (91 races)

 

 

Notes
1 Shared the win with Alexandr Popov at 1987 Canmore sprint.
2 Shared the win with Juri Kashkarov at 1987 Canmore sprint.
3 Shared the win with Halvard Hanevold at 1999 Oslo Holmenkollen sprint.
4 Shared the win with Sven Fischer at 1999 Oslo Holmenkollen sprint.
5 Shared the win with Lukas Hofer at 2014 Antholz-Anterselva sprint.
6 Shared the win with Simon Schempp at 2014 Antholz-Anterselva sprint.

Women
Note:  Andrea Henkel is the only biathlete to win World Cup races in three decades. 
1980s (50 races)

1990s (164 races)

2000s (255 races, 1 tied result)

2010s (256 races)

 

2020s (90 races)

Notes
1 Shared the win with Martina Beck at 2003 Khanty-Mansiysk pursuit.
2 Shared the win with Sandrine Bailly at 2003 Khanty-Mansiysk pursuit.

Most wins in a season

Most podiums in a season

Most consecutive wins

Most consecutive podiums

Most starts 
List of top 10 most started all male and female biathletes in individual World Cup or Olympic races. Biathletes whose names are in bold are still active.
 Updated: 20 March, 2023

See also 
Biathlon World Championships
List of Olympic medalists in biathlon

References

External links 
 IBU Website
 IBU Datacenter

 
World Cup
World cups in winter sports
Recurring sporting events established in 1978